Allan Bunting (born 11 February 1975) is a New Zealand rugby union and sevens coach. He previously coached the Black Ferns sevens and was the inaugural head coach of the Chiefs Manawa in the Super Rugby Aupiki competition. He was appointed as the Black Ferns fifteens coach in February 2023.

Playing career 
Between 1999 and 2009 Bunting played for the New Zealand sevens team, the Chiefs, the Bay of Plenty Steamers and Tokyo Gas.

Coaching career 
Bunting was the assistant coach for the Black Ferns Sevens from 2012 to 2016. He has also been the skills coach for the All Blacks Sevens and assistant coach for the Wellington Lions Sevens.

Bunting replaced Sean Horan as head coach of the New Zealand women's sevens team after the 2016 Summer Olympics. After taking leave in 2019, he returned and co-coached the team with Cory Sweeney until the Tokyo Olympics. They won gold after defeating France in the Gold medal final. Bunting stepped down as co-coach after the Olympics and was later appointed as Chiefs Manawa head coach.

In February 2023, Bunting was appointed as the Black Ferns coach through to the 2025 Rugby World Cup in England. He replaced Wayne Smith as the Black Ferns Director of Rugby.

References 

Living people
New Zealand rugby union coaches
Rugby sevens in New Zealand
New Zealand Olympic coaches
New Zealand national rugby sevens team coaches
1975 births